The August Complex was a massive wildfire that burned in the Coast Range of Northern California, in Glenn, Lake, Mendocino, Tehama, Trinity, and Shasta Counties. The complex originated as 38 separate fires started by lightning strikes on August 16–17, 2020. Four of the largest fires, the Doe, Tatham, Glade, and Hull fires, had burned together by August 30. On September 9, the Doe Fire, the main fire of the August Complex, surpassed the 2018 Mendocino Complex to become both the single-largest wildfire and the largest fire complex in recorded California history. On September 10, the combined Doe Fire also merged with the Elkhorn Fire (originally a separate incident) and the Hopkins Fire, growing substantially in size.

The fire largely burned within the Mendocino National Forest, with portions spilling over to the Shasta-Trinity National Forest and Six Rivers National Forest in the north, as well as private land surrounding the forests. Large areas of the Yolla Bolly-Middle Eel Wilderness and Yuki Wilderness had also been burned. Rugged terrain combined with consistent high winds and record heat had complicated firefighting efforts. Although more than 2,900 personnel were deployed to the fire through mid-September, it took almost three months to fully contain the fire. The U.S. Forest Service managed the firefighting effort, with assistance from the California Department of Forestry and Fire Protection.

Due to the immense size of the affected area, the fire was managed as four separate incidents (initially three) within a larger complex. The Doe Fire was defined as the August Complex South Zone and the Elkhorn Fire was defined as the August Complex North Zone, which was later divided into the August Complex Northwest Zone and the August Complex Northeast Zone. The August Complex West Zone was split off from the western portions of the Elkhorn Fire and the Doe Fire, and was managed by Cal Fire.

Due to the remote location of the fire, there were no civilian fatalities, while 935 structures were reported destroyed. However, one firefighter was killed, and at least two others were seriously injured.

Timeline

August
On the early morning of August 17, thunderstorms carried northward from the weakening Tropical Storm Fausto moved across Glenn and Mendocino Counties, starting at least 13 fires. Thunderstorm activity continued for another couple of days, igniting even more wildfires on August 17. On the morning of August 17, the Elkhorn Fire was ignited north of the Doe Fire and east of the Hopkins Fire, near Maple Creek, in Tehama County, which was separate from the August Complex at the time. In addition, the Box Fire in the Snow Mountain Wilderness reached , and the Rockwell and Pine Kop Fires west of Elk Creek had burned  and  respectively. Aided by thunderstorm activity and strong winds, the fires expanded rapidly throughout the day, and more fires were discovered bringing the total to 20. Forest Service officials decided to manage these fires as one incident, the August Complex. 

Over the next two days, hot dry weather and gusty winds caused the fires to explode in size. Additional fires were discovered, increasing the total to 35. By the morning of August 20, the fires had burned  and were advancing downslope to the east. In Glenn County, evacuation orders were issued for parts of Elk Creek, Chrome, Burrows Gap, and Red Mountain, and an evacuation warning for Grindstone Rancheria. All of Glenn County west of County Road 306 was placed under an evacuation order. On August 21, due to continued high fire danger, the Mendocino National Forest was temporarily closed to all public access.

At this point, some of the larger fires had burned together. Ten structures were destroyed, though no deaths or injuries were reported. A total of 433 personnel were assigned to the fire.

On August 29, the Doe Fire absorbed the Tatham Fire, while the Hopkins Fire had spread east into the Shasta-Trinity National Forest. The Doe Fire was now 52 percent contained, though the complex overall remained at 18 percent, as the other fires continued to spread. A heat wave combined with extremely smoky conditions hampered aircraft operations. On August 30, the Doe Fire also absorbed the Hull and Glade Fires, making the complex essentially one large fire, with the exception of the Hopkins Fire to the north. There were 607 personnel committed to the fire; crews stopped flames from advancing further south towards Lake County, but the fire continued to burn largely uncontrolled to the west. A containment line was being constructed west of the Glade Fire, in the vicinity of the Black Butte River and Bald Mountain.

September
Firefighters were building containment lines along the west side of the Doe Fire and the south side of the Hull Fire. One firefighter was confirmed dead in a vehicle accident, and another was injured. Over the next few days, the fire continued to expand rapidly, burning about  a day, reaching  on September 4. Crews conducted back burns west of the Tatham Fire and northwest of the Hull Fire. Increased fire activity in eastern Mendocino County led to an evacuation warning for the Mendocino National Forest, north of Hull Mountain. Back-burns were conducted on the northwest side of the Doe Fire, in anticipation of extreme wind conditions. A total of 1,138 personnel were working on the fire.

On September 8, evacuation orders remained in place for western Glenn County and eastern Mendocino County, and had been expanded to parts of northern Lake County. Strong Diablo winds continued to drive fire activity, but helped clear smoke westward, allowing for increased aircraft operations. During September 8–9, the fires grew rapidly, driven by strong east winds. On September 9, the Elkhorn Fire merged with the Hopkins Fire, and the combined fire was assigned to the Elkhorn Fire incident and no longer managed as part of the August Complex. On the same day, the southern front of the Elkhorn Fire merged into the northern perimeter of the Doe Fire in southwest Tehama County, but the August Complex and the Elkhorn Fire continued being managed as separate incidents, in order to have the separate incident teams focus on their individual fire areas. On September 10, the August Complex jumped containment lines on the southwest, crossing the Black Butte River and moving into the Yuki Wilderness, triggering evacuations in Lake County, north of Lake Pillsbury.

On September 10, the combined Elkhorn and Hopkins Fires were being managed jointly as the Elkhorn Fire, which had burned . The fire rapidly advanced into the Six Rivers National Forest, jumping the canyons of the Mad River and North Fork Eel River, before crossing the Eel River south of Alderpoint. Evacuations were ordered in Humboldt County from Bridgeville south to Fort Seward and Alderpoint, while areas from there west to U.S. Highway 101 received an evacuation advisory. 

On the morning of September 11, the Forest Service was continuing to manage the two fires as separate incidents within the larger complex, due to the immense size of the complex's burn area. The western portion of the Elkhorn Fire was further designated as the "August Complex West Zone", which was managed by CAL FIRE.

On September 11, the southwestern flank of the South Zone continued pushing further west into Mendocino County. An evacuation order was issued for areas east of Covelo. Due to the rapid fire spread and thick smoke in the area, officials had trouble estimating the actual size of the fire. On September 13, the fire was thought to have reached . Most firefighting activity was concentrated in the Lake Pillsbury area on the South Zone, in an effort to stop the fire from advancing further west. Back-burns and mop up operations were continued on the north and east perimeters to strengthen the fire lines there. At this time the fire was 30 percent contained. On the North Zone, the fire continued advancing north, jumping the South Fork Trinity River and advancing towards State Route 36. Firefighters were working to save homes around the Ruth Lake area.

On September 16, it was reported that 35 structures were destroyed, and 400 were still threatened. On the South Zone, the fire continued spreading through the Yuki Wilderness and Sanhedrin Wilderness. On the North Zone, firefighting efforts were focused on stopping the advance north of the South Fork Trinity River. On September 18, evacuations were lifted in the Glenn County portion of the Mendocino National Forest, as the eastern flank of the fire was almost fully contained. On September 19, some evacuations in Mendocino County were also downgraded to an evacuation warning. Firefighters conducted back-burns west and northwest of Lake Pillsbury.

By September 21, a significant portion of the large, previously-unburned section of the Yolla Bolly-Middle Eel Wilderness between the North and South Zones had been burned over. In Trinity County, evacuation orders were in effect for the communities of Ruth, Forest Glen, Post Mountain, and Trinity Pines, as the North Zone continued advancing towards State Route 36. Additional crews were sent in an effort to prevent the fire from crossing the highway.

On September 24, the North Zone was still holding south of State Route 36, in part due to back burning operations. However, the highway was closed to civilian traffic. On the South Zone, firefighters had made considerable progress halting the advance near Lake Pillsbury. On the West Zone, the fire continued to threaten Humboldt County. More than 2,000 personnel were assigned to the West Zone at this time. On September 24, members of the California National Guard were also deployed to the West Zone.

September 28 saw increased fire activity on the North Zone, as the onset of a heatwave and Diablo winds drove the flames. The fire jumped north of State Route 36 and traveled rapidly along the South Fork Trinity River canyon. It also jumped west across Ruth Lake, burning towards the upper Van Duzen River drainage and Zenia. High winds blew embers as far as  ahead of the active fire front. Structures and power lines were reported destroyed in the Ruth Lake and Hettenshaw Valley areas. Evacuation orders were issued in Trinity County from Ruth Lake and Mad River west to the Humboldt County line. Evacuation warnings were also issued for Humboldt County from Alderpoint east to the Trinity County line. On the South Zone, the fire held within containment lines at Lake Pillsbury, but evacuation orders remained in place in nearby areas of Mendocino and Lake Counties.

October
This made the August Complex the first "gigafire" (a fire spanning over a million acres) in the modern history of California. Due to an ongoing La Niña event, California got less rainfall than usual, and the rainy season started later than would typically be seen in October. This made difficult conditions for firefighters and extended the fire season.

November
After a couple of small rain events and favorable weather, firefighters and aircraft were able contain most of the fire by mid-November, with over 95% containment reported on November 9. Trinity County Environmental Health officials warned that the fire could potentially have contaminated ground and surface water in certain areas affected by the fire. They warned not to drink water from the area, noting that boiling water does not remove contaminants. On November 12, the Forest Service reported that the August Complex had finally reached 100% containment, with the combined incident management being disbanded that same day.

Fire growth and containment progress

*Note: The large jump in area burned on September 11 was due to a merger with Elkhorn fire late on September 10.

See also

2020 California wildfires
List of California wildfires

References

External links

 August Complex Incident Overview (South Zone) at InciWeb
 Elkhorn Fire Incident Overview (North Zone) at InciWeb
 August Complex - 2020 - An Argis storymap on the August Complex fire

2020 California wildfires
Wildfires in Glenn County, California
Wildfires in Lake County, California
Wildfires in Mendocino County, California
Wildfires in Tehama County, California
Wildfires in Trinity County, California
Wildfires in Shasta County, California
Wildfires in Colusa County, California
August 2020 events in the United States